Danny Vladimir Torres Angel (born November 7, 1987 in San Salvador, El Salvador) is a Salvadoran professional footballer.

Club career

Atlético Marte
Torres signed with Atlético Marte in 2005. With Torres, Atlético Marte return to the Primera División in the Apertura 2009.

Torres left the club after the Clausura 2012 ended.

Alianza
Torres signed with Alianza for the Apertura 2012. In his first tournament with Alianza, he reached the final of the Apertura 2012. Alianza finished in second place with 34 points. However, Alianza lost the final against Isidro Metapán on penalties in the Estadio Cuscatlán.

In the next tournament, the Clausura 2013, Alianza reached the semi-finals but was eliminated by Luis Ángel Firpo.

With Alianza, Torres won the Apertura 2015 final against FAS (1–0 victory).

Alianza reached a new final in the Clausura 2017, but lost against Santa Tecla (0–4 defeat). Torres started in the game. He left the club after that final.

Sonsonate
Torres signed with Sonsonate for the Apertura 2017 tournament. In September 2017, Torres was honored in a match against Isidro Metapán for its 300 matches in Primera División.

With Sonsonate, Torres reached the semi-finals of the Apertura 2016, but they were eliminated by Alianza 0–4 on aggregate.

In the Clausura 2018, Sonsonate fought to not descend and disputed an extra game to decide the team that would play in Segunda División against Dragón, a match that was played in the Estadio Cuscatlán and that Sonsonate won 3–2.

Torres left the team before the start of the Apertura 2018. However, with Sonsonate he lived arrears in salary payments.

Honours

Alianza
 Primera División (1): Apertura 2015

References

1987 births
Living people
Salvadoran footballers
El Salvador international footballers
Alianza F.C. footballers
C.D. Atlético Marte footballers
2015 CONCACAF Gold Cup players
Association football defenders